East Middle School may refer to:

 East Middle School (California)
 East Middle School (Farmington, Michigan)
 East Middle School (Oklahoma)